is a Japanese actress and former member of Japanese idol girl group AKB48, of which she was the captain of Team K. She was also a member of the AKB48 subunit Not Yet. In addition to the singles that involved the rock-paper-scissors tournaments, she sang on the title tracks for all of AKB48's singles since "Aitakatta" in October 2006.  She placed among the top two of the annual AKB48 general elections from 2009 to 2013. Oshima is currently represented with Ohta Production.

Biography 

Oshima was born in Yokohama, and was raised in Mibu, Tochigi Prefecture. Her mother is from Hokkaido. Oshima is 3/4 Japanese and 1/4 American. Her parents divorced 6 months after her family moved to Mibu. Oshima lived with her father while she only saw her mother once after the divorce. In 1996, she signed as a child actor with Central Kodomo Gekidan. In 2005, she began working as a junior idol in a short-lived idol project Doll's Vox, which was produced by The Alfee vocalist Toshihiko Takamizawa. In 2006, at the AKB48's second audition to form Team K, she was selected out of a pool of 12,000 applicants to join the team. In April, she began working full-time with the group, which debuted with the single, "Aitakatta", in October 2006.

On August 24, 2012, AKB48 announced a reorganization of the teams, and appointed Oshima to be the captain of Team K.

On December 31, 2013, Oshima announced on Kohaku Uta Gassen that she would be leaving the group. On February 26, 2014, the last single for her as a member of AKB48 and as the center performer of that, ”Mae shika Mukanee" was released. She graduated from AKB48 on June 9, 2014, by the performance at the AKB48 theatre.

On July 29, 2021, Oshima announced her marriage to actor and Scarlet co-star Kento Hayashi.  She gave birth to their first child on January 5, 2023.

AKB48 general elections
Oshima has placed in the top two in the first five AKB48 general elections. In 2009 she placed second overall, losing only to Atsuko Maeda. In 2010, she received the most votes and became the center performer in the single "Heavy Rotation". In the 2011 general election, she placed second to Maeda once again. In the 2012 general election, she placed first with 108,837 votes and became the center performer in the single "Gingham Check". In the 2013 general election, she was voted second overall with 136,503 votes and lost to Rino Sashihara with 150,570 votes.

Discography

Singles with AKB48

Singles with Not Yet

Singles with SKE48

Stage units

Team K 1st Stage 
 
Team K 2nd Stage 
 
 
Team K 3rd Stage 
  (Solo Unit)
Himawarigumi 1st Stage 
 
Himawarigumi 2nd Stage 
 "Confession"
Team K 4th Stage 
 
Team K 5th Stage 
 "End Roll"
Team K 6th Stage Reset
 
Team K Waiting Stage
 "Glory Days"
 "Higurashi no Koi" (new units)

Filmography

Films

Dramas

Japanese dub

Variety shows
 AKBingo!
 
 
 
 Hoko x Tate
 Naruhodo High School
 
 AKB48 SHOW!
 Woman On The Planet

Other media

Photobooks
[2001.07.10] Charm (with Tajima Honami) 
[2003.10.18] かがやくきもち (Kagayaku Kimochi) 
[2008.12.19] ゆうらりゆうこ (Yuurari Yūko) 
[2009.10.17] 優子のありえない日常 (Yūko no Arienai Nichijou) 
[2010.08.25] 君は、誰のもの? (Kimi wa, Dare no Mono?) (aka Oshima Yuko L.A.) 
[2011.06.17] 優子 (Yūko) 
[2014.09.18] 脱ぎやがれ! (Nugiyagare! Photographed by Mika Ninagawa)

Magazines
 smart, Takarajimasha 1995-, since 2011

Radio shows

Awards and nominations

References

External links

 

1988 births
Living people
Japanese people of American descent
AKB48 members
Japanese idols
Japanese television actresses
Japanese child actresses
Japanese women pop singers
Musicians from Tochigi Prefecture
Actors from Tochigi Prefecture
21st-century Japanese actresses
Sony Music Entertainment Japan artists
21st-century Japanese women singers
21st-century Japanese singers